Eugenius Ó Faoláin was Bishop of Kilmacduagh during 1409–1418.

Appointed 23 September 1409 (papal bulls expediated 25 May 1410), he was translated to Killaloe on 6 July 1418.

His surname is anglicised as Whelan and Phelan. Though mainly found in Leinster and Munster, it is also native to Connacht.

References

Bibliography
 The Surnames of Ireland, Edward MacLysaght, 1978.
 A New History of Ireland: Volume IX - Maps, Genealogies, Lists, ed. T.W. Moody, F.X. Martin, F.J. Byrne, pp. 322–324.

People from County Galway
15th-century Roman Catholic bishops in Ireland